Crisis in Six Scenes is an American television miniseries written and directed by Woody Allen for Amazon Studios. Allen wrote and directed six episodes for the half-hour series, marking the first time he has done so for television. It is available exclusively on Amazon Prime Video.

The series premiered on September 30, 2016, to generally unfavorable reviews. Allen himself denounced the series, calling it a "cosmic embarrassment," and stated that it would conclude with one season.

Cast and characters

Main
 Woody Allen as Sidney Munsinger 
 Miley Cyrus as Lennie Dale
 Elaine May as Kay Munsinger
 Rachel Brosnahan as Ellie
 John Magaro as Allen Brockman

Guest
 Becky Ann Baker as Lee
 Joy Behar as Ann
 Lewis Black as Al
 Max Casella as Dominic
 Christine Ebersole as Eve
 Gad Elmaleh as Moe
 David Harbour as Vic
 Margaret Ladd as Gail
 Michael Rapaport as Trooper Mike
 Rebecca Schull as Rose

Production

Development

The deal with Allen was seen as giving Amazon a possible advantage in its competition with Netflix and television networks. The series was announced within days of Amazon winning the Golden Globe Award for the comedy-drama Transparent, another original series. Allen had last written new material for television in the 1950s, when he wrote for Sid Caesar.

In a May 2015 interview, Allen said that progress on the series had been "very, very difficult" and that he had "regretted every second since I said OK".  Allen has said of the series, "I don't know how I got into this. I have no ideas and I'm not sure where to begin. My guess is that Roy Price [the head of Amazon Studios] will regret this."

Casting
In January 2016, it was announced that the series would star Allen, Elaine May and Miley Cyrus, and that shooting would begin in March. In February 2016, it was announced that John Magaro and Rachel Brosnahan had joined the cast. In March 2016, Michael Rapaport, Becky Ann Baker, Margaret Ladd, Joy Behar, Rebecca Schull, David Harbour and Christine Ebersole had joined the cast of the series.

Filming
For about three weeks in early 2016, filming for the six episodes took place at 508 Scarborough Road, in Briarcliff Manor, New York.

Episodes

Reception

Critical response
On review aggregator website Rotten Tomatoes, the series has an approval rating of 18%, based on 50 reviews, with an average rating of 4.72/10. The site's critical consensus reads, "Woody Allen's filmmaking skills prove a poor fit for the small screen in Crisis in Six Scenes, a talk-heavy, unfunny, and overall disengaged production buried below numerous superior offerings." On Metacritic, the series has a score 44 out of 100, based on 29 critics, indicating "mixed or average reviews".

Rodrigo Perez from The Playlist gave the series a D+ on an A+ to F scale, and described it as "Hamfisted and nearly unwatchable."

Allen himself had openly expressed severe misgivings about the project. At the 2015 Cannes Film Festival, Allen said in reference to the show, "It was a catastrophic mistake. I don't know what I'm doing. I'm floundering. I expect this to be a cosmic embarrassment."

References

External links
 

2010s American comedy television miniseries
2016 American television series debuts
2016 American television series endings
Amazon Prime Video original programming
Television series by Amazon Studios
Television shows filmed in New York (state)
Works by Woody Allen